The Archdeacon of Leicester is a senior ecclesiastical officer in the Church of England Diocese of Leicester.

History
The first archdeacon of Leicester is recorded before 1092 – around the time when archdeacons were first appointed in England – in the Diocese of Lincoln. He was one of eight archdeacons appointed by the bishop: Lincoln, Huntingdon, Northampton, Oxford, Buckingham, Bedford and Stow.

In the Victorian era reforms, the archdeaconry became part of Peterborough diocese on 1 May 1839 and, on 12 November 1926, the modern Diocese of Leicester was founded from Leicester and Loughborough archdeaconries and part of the archdeaconry of Northampton.

List of archdeacons

High Medieval
bef. 1092–?: Ranulph (first Archdeacon of Leicester)
Godfrey
bef. –aft. : Walter
bef. –1148 (res.): Robert de Chesney
bef. 1150–bef. 1159 (res.): Hugh Barre
bef. 1163–aft. 1177: Baldric de Segillo
–1189 (res.): Hamo (afterwards Dean of Lincoln)
bef. –1195 (res.): Roger de Rolleston (afterwards Dean of Lincoln)
bef. –aft. 1224: Reimund
bef. 1226–aft. 1228: William Blund of Lincoln
bef. 1229–1232 (res.): Robert Grosseteste
1232–1234: William de Dratton
bef. 1235–1252 (d.): John of Basingstoke
1252–bef. 1274: Solomon of Dover
1275–bef. 1295 (d.): Roger de Saxenhurst
16 January 1295 – 16 September 1310 (d.): Roger Martival

Late Medieval
13 October 1310 – 5 October 1346 (d.): Guillaume Cardinal de Farges (cardinal-deacon of Santa Maria Nova)
1346–26 February 1347 (res.): Raynald Orsini
Arnald de Gavarreto was unsuccessfully provided to the archdeaconry in 1347 and was still claiming it – unsuccessfully – in 1355.
1347–bef. 1354 (d.): Henry Chaddesden
12 May 1354 – 1361 (d.): William Doune
bef. 1371–27 August 1372 (d.): Philippe Cardinal de Cabassoles (Cardinal-Bishop of Sabina and Archdeacon of York)
1372–13 August 1379 (d.): Giacomo Cardinal Orsini, Dean of Salisbury (cardinal-deacon of San Giorgio in Velabro)
1380–2 February 1395 (d.): Poncello Orsini (cardinal-priest of San Clemente; papal claimant, never in actual possession)
1390– (res.): John Bottlesham (royal grant)
4 August 1392–bef. 1421: John Elvet
1392–1392 (rev.): Richard Holland (mistaken royal grant; revoked)
bef. 1414–1424 (exch.): Richard Elvet
29 October 1424–bef. 1430: John Legbourne
bef. 1430–aft. 1431: Thomas Barnsley
14 August 1454 – 1458 (res.): Richard Ewen (afterwards Archdeacon of Lincoln)
1458–bef. 1473 (d.): William Witham (also Dean of Arches from 1460 and Dean of Wells from 1467)
1473–bef. 1478: Roger Rotherham
1478–1479 (res.): John Morton
1485–bef. 1508 (d.): Richard Lavender
18 March 1508–bef. 1515: William Spark
1515–bef. 1518: Henry Wilcocks
1518–bef. 1531 (d.): Richard Maudeley

25 March 1531–December 1531 (res.): Stephen Gardiner
14 December 1531 – 1535 (res.): Edward Foxe
9 October 1535 – 1539 (res.): Edmund Bonner
24 September 1539–bef. 1541 (d.): William More, Bishop suffragan of Colchester

Early modern
19 February 1541–bef. 1560 (deprived): Thomas Robertson (deprived; also Dean of Durham from 1558, from which point archdeacon in commendam)
1560–15 February 1589 (d.): Richard Barber
10 May 1589 – 16 September 1590 (res.): Hugh Blythe
19 April 1591–bef. 1625 (d.): Robert Johnson
1 August 1625–bef. 1631 (d.): Richard Pilkington
21 September 1631–bef. 1641 (d.): William Warr
16 October 1641 – 1661 (res.): Henry Ferne
18 June 1661 – 27 June 1662 (exch.): Robert Hitch (afterwards Archdeacon of the East Riding, 1662 and Dean of York, 1665)
27 June 1662–bef. 1669 (d.): Clement Breton
30 July 1669 – 23 August 1679 (d.): William Owtram
10 September 1679 – 27 August 1683 (d.): Francis Meres
5 September 1683–bef. 1703 (d.): Byrom Eaton
1703–9 May 1715 (d.): John Rogers
17 May 1715 – 18 May 1756 (d.): David Trimnel
7 July 1756 – 29 August 1772 (d.): John Taylor
17 December 1772 – 23 December 1785 (d.): James Bickham
25 January 1786 – 9 March 1812 (d.): Andrew Burnaby
31 March 1812 – 13 November 1830 (d.): Thomas Parkinson
22 January 1831 – 7 April 1863 (d.): Thomas Bonney
Upon the death of Herbert Marsh on 1 May 1839, Leicester archdeaconry become part of the Diocese of Peterborough.

Late modern
1863–1884 (ret.): Henry Fearon
1884–1886 (d.): Assheton Pownall
1886–1899 (ret.): John Mitchinson (former Bishop of Barbados then of the Windward Islands)
1899–1920 (ret.): John Stocks
1921–1938 (ret.): Frederick MacNutt
From 12 November 1926, the archdeaconry formed part of the new Leicester diocese.
1938–1956 (ret.): Cecil Matthews (afterwards archdeacon emeritus)
1956–1963 (res.): Irven Edwards
1963–1980 (ret.): Berkeley Cole (afterwards archdeacon emeritus)
1980–1994 (res.): David Silk
1994–2002 (res.): Mike Edson
2002–April 2012 (res.): Richard Atkinson
20128 September 2018 (res.): Tim Stratford (became Dean of Chester)
4 November 2018present: Richard Worsfold

References

Citations

Sources 

Lists of Anglicans
 
Lists of English people
Archdeacon
Diocese of Leicester